Henry Norman may refer to:

 Sir Henry Norman, 1st Baronet (1858–1939), English journalist and Liberal politician
 Nigel Norman (Sir Henry Nigel St Valery Norman, 2nd Baronet, 1897–1943), consulting civil engineer and Royal Air Force officer
 Henry C. Norman (1850–1913), photographer based in Natchez, Mississippi, see Norman Studio
 Henry Norman (cricketer) (1801–1867), English cricketer
 Sir Henry Wylie Norman (1826–1904), Indian Army officer and colonial administrator